Erik Gustafson may refer to:

Erik Gustafson (editor) of Sports Car International
Erik Gustafson (musician) of Surrounded (band)

See also
Erik Gustafsson (disambiguation)
Nils-Eric Gustafsson (1922–2017)
Eric Gustafson (disambiguation)
Derek Gustafson (born 1979)